The National Association for Children of Alcoholics (Nacoa) is a charity in the United Kingdom providing information and support for everyone affected by their parent's drinking through a free, confidential telephone and email helpline. Nacoa is a registered charity in England and Wales – charity number 1009143.

History 
Nacoa was founded in 1990 "to address the needs of children growing up in families where one or both parents suffer from alcoholism or a similar addictive problem". This includes COAs (children of alcoholics) of all ages, many of whose problems only become apparent in adulthood.

The founders were Hilary Henriques, Valerie McGee, Maya Parker, Diana Samways and David Stafford.

Aims 
To help meet the needs of everyone affected by parental alcohol problems, Nacoa has four broad aims:
 To offer information, advice and support to children of alcohol-dependent parents
 To reach professionals who work with them
 To raise their profile in the public consciousness
 To promote research into:
 The particular problems they face
 The prevention of alcoholism developing in this vulnerable group

Research 
Research suggests that 2.05 million adults in the UK claimed they had been brought up in a family where one (or both) parents drank too much. Thirty percent (840,000 people) said that this affected them "very badly" during childhood. Seventy-one percent (1,988,000 people) said they needed someone to talk to who understood the problem of alcoholism, when they were children. A 2002 study found that children of alcoholics experienced mental-health problems, considered suicide, suffered from eating disorders, experienced drug or alcohol addiction themselves and had been in trouble with the police more than control groups.

A more recent study by Manning et al. suggests there are 2.6 million children in the UK (1 in 5) living with a parent who drinks hazardously.

In 2012, Nacoa was involved in a research project for the Children's Commissioner for England reviewing needs and services for children and families affected by parental alcohol misuse. In the report the Children's Commissioner highlights the need for services to support children and their families and suggests that "the misuse of alcohol by parents negatively affects the lives and harms the wellbeing of more children than does the misuse of illegal drugs".

Services 
Nacoa provides information, advice and support for everyone affected by a parent's drinking and people concerned for their welfare. This is provided primarily through a free, confidential telephone and email helpline and website. The helpline is staffed by trained volunteers. Nacoa also produces a range of publications for children (including ‘Some mums and dads drink too much and it's frightening’ and ‘Information for children of alcohol-dependent parents’), parents and professionals. Nacoa raises awareness of the problems faced by children living with parental addiction and the support available through media articles and by delivering delivers talks, for example in schools and to other professional agencies and community organisations. Nacoa is a regular exhibitor at the UK and European Symposium on Addictive Disorders (UKESAD) organised by the alcohol and drug treatment journal Addiction Today.
To commemorate the life of co-founder and author David Stafford, Nacoa holds an annual David Stafford memorial lecture in London. Previous speakers have included Lauren Booth, Bill Gallagher, Virginia Ironside, Fergal Keane and David Yelland.

Funding 
Nacoa relies entirely on voluntary donations. As a membership organisation some of these donations come by way of annual subscriptions. A significant proportion of income comes through people take part in sponsored events. Many people now collect sponsorship online using sites such as Justgiving. Recent sponsored events have included the Avon Gorge Abseil, the Great North Run, the Bristol Half Marathon, the Edinburgh Marathon, a London to Paris bike ride, skydiving and a sponsored haircut. Nacoa was the recipient of the BBC Radio 4 Appeal in 2003.

Nacoa has been the charity partner of Upfest, Europe's largest street art festival, since the festival's beginning in 2008.

Review of 2017 
 
Since 1990, Nacoa has responded to over 327,000 requests for help through traditional helpline contacts by telephone, email and letter; in 2017, 27,406 contacts were received in this way from across the UK. In the same year an estimated 90,678 contacts were made through the website, online message boards, Facebook, Twitter, YouTube channel and online community blog site, COAisathing.

Nacoa's visibility on the digital platform has increased and its social media following is now the largest in the world for a service or individual account targeted at children affected by their parent's drinking.

Nacoa's five founders wanted today's children to have the help and support they did not have and today Nacoa provides a safe space where children, young people and adults find refuge from their isolation and suffering; a reminder that they are not alone through free, inclusive, accessible services, which put the needs of vulnerable people first.

2017 was a challenging year for this small charity which finds it hard to be heard over the clamour of other charities, hundreds of times bigger and with colossal budgets. It was, therefore, gratifying to receive a letter recognising Nacoa's contribution to the first Manifesto for Children of Alcoholics worldwide from the Executive Director of UNICEF, Anthony Lake. Nacoa Patron, The Right Honourable Liam Byrne MP, launched the Manifesto at the David Stafford Memorial Lecture during COA Week.

Nacoa was also awarded Best Vulnerable Persons Helpline in the Social Care Awards, Best for Vulnerable Persons Helpline in the Global Excellence Awards and Best Alcoholism Child Support Service in the UK Enterprise Awards.

The Nacoa Helpline Review of 2001–2015, produced pro bono by Dr Anne-Marie Barron, was published, reporting that the Nacoa helpline had been contacted a quarter of a million times with three-quarters of a million website visits during the fifteen years covered by the study. A third of those who contacted Nacoa were children affected by their parent's drinking, whereas in 2014 and 2015 it was nearer two-thirds. One of the most consistent findings is that approximately a third of those contacting Nacoa have told nobody else about their situation. In 2017, Liam Byrne announced these findings at a meeting with the Secretary of State, Nicola Blackwood MP, in Westminster Hall when she pledged cross-party support to address this social injustice.

In 2017, Nacoa received countless messages extolling the positive impact of its helpline services, which will inform future work and ensure this vulnerable group is no longer ignored. Reaching out and responding to them would not be possible without the extraordinary commitment of volunteers who contributed over 8,500 hours, which equates to five full-time employees at a value of over £120,000.

Awards 
In June 2012 Nacoa was awarded the Queen's Award for Voluntary Service. The award, which is the equivalent an MBE, recognises outstanding achievement by groups of volunteers. Nacoa also received the prestigious Guardian Charity Award in 2006.

Other recognitions include being awarded the Meritorious Service Award 2012 by NACoA USA and the Mentor UK Certificate of merit in 2008. Nacoa's CEO Hilary Henriques was awarded the Women of the Year Outstanding Achievement Award in 2009.
Nacoa is an accredited member of The Helplines Association.

Media 
Nacoa's work featured on BBC Comic Relief's Red Nose Day broadcast in 2009. Later in 2009, Nacoa's work featured on the BBC Children in Need film ‘Brought Up By Booze’ where Nacoa patron Calum Best, son of footballer George Best, explored the effect of his father's drinking on his life and met other children in the UK living in similar situations.
Nacoa's CEO, Hilary Henriques, featured as one of fourteen women from across the world in Comic Relief's publication ‘Inspiring Women’ printed in 2010.

Patrons 
 Tony Adams
 Olly Barkley
 Calum Best
 Lauren Booth
 Rt Hon Liam Byrne MP
 Cherie Lunghi
 Geraldine James OBE
 Elle Macpherson
 Suzanne Stafford
 David Yelland
 CQSW
 Fergal Keane 2002–2009
 Mo Mowlam 1996–2005
 Diana Samways 1997–2011

Ambassadors 
 John Fenston
 Maya Parker
 Emma Spiegler
 Josh Connelly

Trustees 
 John Fenston, Hon. Treasurer
 Laurence Alleyne
 Philip Auden DL
 Anne Marie-Barron
 Deidre Boyd
 Peter Irwin
 Maya Parker MA

Consultative Council 
 Child and Vulnerable Adult Protection – Clare Adams & Katie Wilson
 Clinical Advice – Peter Taberner
 Clinical Psychology and Family Therapy – John Friel & Jerry Moe
 Counselling & Therapy – Lois Evans
 Fiscal Probity – Keith Hall
 GP Liaison – Jacqueline Chang
 Helpline – James Galloway & Jessica Munafo
 Legal – Valerie McGee
Press and Communications – Julia Goodwin, Virginia Ironside & Deidre Saunders
 Research – Martin Callingham

International 
Independent organisations have been set up around the world with similar aims. These include NACoA in the United States, NACOA Deutschland in Germany, Nacoa Brasil in Brazil and NACOA POLSKA in Poland.

COA Week 
Nacoa launched the first Children of Alcoholics Week (COA Week) in the UK in 2009. The week is held annually in February during the week in which Valentine's Day falls and is celebrated internationally. The week raises awareness of children affected by parental alcohol problems and the support available. Supporters of the week include Nacoa's patrons and other well-known people such as Belinda Carlisle, Sheila Hancock Sir Ben Kingsley, Prue Leith, Cherie Lunghi, Marco Pierre White, Craig Revel Horwood, Kim Woodburn and Antony Worrall Thompson.

To celebrate COA Week 2011, Nacoa released their first charity single, a cover of the Sam Cooke classic ‘A change is gonna come’ sung by Maria McAteer (daughter of Al Timothy) with piano and arrangement by Bjorn Dahlberg and strings by the Stanford Quartet. The music video for the single made by Sean Caveille was filmed in Bristol and featured Nacoa volunteers.

References

External links 
 
 Children of Alcoholics Week
 NACoA USA
 NACOA Deutschland
 Nacoa Brasil
 NACOA POLSKA
 COAP

Support groups
Addiction organisations in the United Kingdom
Organizations established in 1990
1990 establishments in the United Kingdom
Alcohol abuse in the United Kingdom